Once Upon a One More Time is a jukebox musical comedy based on songs popularized by Britney Spears. Set in a fantasy storybook realm, the plot follows numerous fairy-tale characters transformed by a feminist awakening.

Synopsis 
While gathered together at a reading group for fairy-tale princesses, Cinderella makes a desperate wish for a new story. A fairy godmother grants her wish, introducing the enchanted land to The Feminine Mystique. The book emboldens the group, which includes Snow White, The Little Mermaid, Sleeping Beauty, Rapunzel, and Princess and the Pea, to gain a new perspective on themselves, as they realize waiting around to be rescued or kissed by a prince isn't the only road to 'happily ever after'.

Development 
Work on a musical based around Britney Spears songs was initially announced in May 2017. A year later Britney attended the first reading of the musical. Theater owner James L. Nederlander announced Once Upon a One More Time would be staged by Broadway In Chicago at the Nederlander Theatre in late fall 2019 prior to a New York City transfer.

Productions

Chicago (2020) 
Once Upon a One More Time was initially scheduled to premiere October 29, 2019 in Chicago, but was soon delayed to the following year.  The musical premiere at the James M. Nederlander Theatre was then scheduled for April 14, 2020, running through May 17 (anticipating New York previews at the Marquis Theatre on June 26, and a Broadway opening July 30). But on March 12, Illinois Governor J. B. Pritzker announced a ban on all large gatherings through May 1, 2020, in response to the coronavirus pandemic.  As a result of widespread theatre closures across the United States, producers canceled the Chicago engagement.

Prior to the cancelation of the Chicago engagement, producers announced casting Briga Heelan as Cinderella and Justin Guarini as Prince Charming, with direction and choreography by Keone and Mari Madrid, the acclaimed husband-wife duo whose choreography work includes Disney's "Us Again", "Beyond Babel", and music videos & appearances for Justin Bieber, BTS, Billie Eilish, Ed Sheeran, Flying Lotus & Kendrick Lamar.

In an interview on the podcast Turning Cole Into Diamonds, actor Kevin Trinio Perdido confirmed that the production remained slated for a Broadway debut in 2022, even without Chicago previews.

Washington DC (2021)
When theater operations resumed following the Covid-19 pandemic, the show announced a new world premiere run, at the Shakespeare Theatre Company in Washington DC, from November 30, 2021 to January 3, 2022 at Sidney Harman Hall. Subsequent demand for tickets extended the engagement to January 9, to become the top-selling show in the company's 35-year history. Ahead of the musical's opening night, Peter Marks of the Washington Post wrote that the musical is "one of the most ambitious new musicals in a theater world awakening to a creative new day. Once Upon a One More Time seems a most unlikely cultural mash-up, reframing Cinderella, Snow White and Sleeping Beauty and a bevy of other storybook characters in an enlightened, modern context. Filling out their story is a narrative inspired by Betty Friedan’s groundbreaking 'The Feminine Mystique,' Spears’s songbook, the choreography of a pair of hip-hop-savvy directors — and “American Idol” runner-up Justin Guarini as Prince Charming."

In a 2021 interview, star Briga Heelan spoke about "how the show explores the content of the stories we pass on, and the effect they have on the aspirations of the listeners. This raises the question of what kinds of fairy tales we want the next generation to take as their own. Our show speaks to the legacy and the history of these princess stories.” Justin Guarini added, "People are going to come expecting a jukebox musical light, and they’re going to be very pleasantly surprised when they recognize that this is an emotional journey, a beautiful story of discovery and redemption. It turns out that we are able to marry these songs that we cherish to a new set of ideas and concepts. And they take on a whole new life.”

Reviews of the Washington D.C. production praised the cast's exuberant performances, as well as the musical's clever and timely script. “Once Upon A One More Time is as thought-provoking as it is toe-tapping, as clever as it is hilarious, as bold as it is shiny, and a bona fide success." (DC Metro Theater Arts). Broadway World wrote "the show's high-energy numbers are so full of sharp choreography and powerful vocal performances, you'll want to keep dancing and singing, even after these numbers are over.”The Washington Post lauded Briga Heelan's "winning caliber of poise in her portrayal of Cinderella… and the cast, nearly two dozen strong, meets the material with the zest demanded of them,” but also expressed concern that the production is "vibrating on hyperdrive" and "packs in too many songs." Some critics debated the show's aim to appeal to multiple generations - DC Metro Theater Arts critic John Stoltenberg wrote, “Once Upon A One More Time wakes up centuries of bedtime stories, and I predict it will be an intergenerational smash.”  Maya Phillips of The New York Times wrote "The audience cheered at the clever pairings of songs with plot points, like an unfaithful prince singing “Oops! … I Did It Again” or Cinderella’s evil stepmother singing “Toxic." But as I watched the show, I wondered: Who is the target audience? So many Broadway shows are aimed at a general audience, and similarly, this one seems to want to appeal to both children and adults."

Broadway (2023) 
A Broadway run at the Marquis Theatre will begin previews May 13, 2023, with an opening date set for June 22. Keone and Mari Madrid will once again direct and choreograph. Heelan, Guarini, and Jackson will reprise their respective roles as Cinderella, Prince Charming, and Snow White. Tony nominees Jennifer Simard and Adam Godley will replace Emily Skinner and Michael McGrath as the Stepmother and the Narrator. Further casting will be announced at a later date.

Musical numbers
The show features 23 songs previously recorded by Spears.

Act I
"...Baby One More Time" – Company
"Make Me..." – Prince Charming, Cinderella
"Lucky" – The Princesses
"Work Bitch" – Belinda, Bethany, Stepmother, Cinderella
"Boys" / "Pretty Girls" – Cinderella, Bethany, Belinda, Prince Ebullient, Prince Erudite, Prince Suave, Prince Affable, Prince Brawny, Prince Mischievous
"Circus" – Prince Charming
"Sometimes" – Cinderella, Prince Charming
"Oops!...I Did It Again" – Prince Charming, Snow White, Cinderella
"From the Bottom of My Broken Heart" – Snow White, Clumsy
"I'm a Slave 4 U" / "Piece of Me" – Belinda, Bethany, Cinderella
"Womanizer" – Cinderella, Snow White, Sleeping Beauty, Rapunzel, Belle, The Little Mermaid, Princess and the Pea
"Scream & Shout" – Original Fairy Godmother, The Princesses
"I Wanna Go" – The Princesses

Act II
"(You Drive Me) Crazy" – Company
"Lucky (Reprise)" - Snow White
"Cinderella" – Cinderella, Prince Charming
"Toxic" – Stepmother, Narrator
"Everytime" – Cinderella
"If I'm Dancing" – The Little Mermaid, Rapunzel
"Stronger" – Original Fairy Godmother, The Princesses
"I Wanna Go (Reprise)" - Prince Charming
"Passenger" – Company
"Till the World Ends (Megamix)" – Company

Cast

Film adaptation
Sony Pictures acquired film rights to Once Upon a One More Time in April 2019, with Spears producing alongside Larry Rudolph and John Davis through his company Davis Entertainment.

See also
& Juliet - a similar jukebox musical that features the music of Max Martin and modernizes Shakespeare

References 

2021 musicals
Britney Spears
Jukebox musicals
Fantasy theatre
Musicals based on secular traditions
Works based on Grimms' Fairy Tales
Works based on Cinderella
Works based on Sleeping Beauty
Works based on Snow White